Boaz Huss (born 1959) is a professor of Kabbalah at the Goldstein-Goren Department of Jewish Thought at Ben-Gurion University of the Negev. He is a leading scholar in contemporary Kabbalah.

Early life and education
Boaz Huss was born in Jerusalem, Israel. He completed his undergraduate and graduate work at the Hebrew University of Jerusalem, where he earned a B.A. in Philosophy and History of Jewish Thought in 1986 and a Ph.D. in History of Jewish Thought in 1993. His doctoral thesis, Ketem Paz – The Kabbalistic Doctrine of Rabbi Simeon Lavi in His Commentary to the Zohar, was supervised by Professor Moshe Idel.

He was a Fulbright post-doctoral fellow at Yale University (1993/4), a Starr fellow at the Center for Jewish Studies at Harvard University (2002), and a fellow at The Institute for Advanced Studies at The Hebrew University of Jerusalem (1998/9, 2008/9). He lectured at Hebrew University (1994–1996) and Tel Aviv University (1995–1996) before coming to the Goldstein-Goren department of Jewish Thought at Ben-Gurion University; he has chaired the department in  2010-2012. He has received several research grants, including two 4-year grants from the Israel Science Foundation on the subjects of "Major Trends in 20th Century Kabbalah" (2005) and "Kabbalah and the Theosophical Society (1875-1936)".

Huss is a board member of the European Society for the Study of Western Esotericism, and has served on the editorial boards of the Zohar Education Project in Chicago and the International Journal for the Study of New Religions.

Scholarship
Huss' research interests cover the Zohar and its reception, modern and contemporary Kabbalah, Western esotericism, and the New Age. His first monograph was dedicated to the Kabbalah of Rabbi Shimon Lavi, one of the first commentators of the Zohar. In his second monograph he examined the reception of the Zohar and the construction of its symbolic value. Huss was one of the first scholars to "take seriously more contemporary expressions of Jewish mysticism that have been largely ignored by scholars".

He has written about the communist Kabbalah of Rabbi Yehuda Ashlag, about Kabbalistic motifs used by Madonna, and about the New Age and postmodern characteristic of contemporary Kabbalah. Huss also studied the history of Kabbalah research, and criticized the use of the term "mysticism" as the defining category of Kabbalah and Hasidism, and the theological framework of the academic study of Jewish mysticism. He is widely quoted in contemporary Kabbalah literature.

In 2006 he appeared as himself in the TV movie "Decoding the Past: Secrets of Kabbalah", together with other Kabbalah scholars such as Michael Berg, Pinchas Giller, Moshe Idel, Daniel C. Matt, Ronit Meroz, and Byron Sherwin.

Selected bibliography

 (ed. with Marco Pasi, Kocku von Stuckrad)

References

External links
 homepage
 Boaz Huss at Academia.edu
 Boaz Huss at ESSWE
 "Academia looks seriously at Kabbalah" The Jerusalem Post, May 22, 2008

1959 births
Living people
People from Jerusalem
Kabbalah
Academic staff of Ben-Gurion University of the Negev
Hebrew University of Jerusalem alumni
Harvard University people
Western esotericism scholars